Anthony "Tony" Gilham (born 19 May 1979) is a British auto racing driver.
 He is the founder and owner of Team HARD. Racing, who currently compete in various championships including the British Touring Car Championship.

Racing career

Early years
Born in Bromley, Kent, Gilham's first full season of racing – after previously competing as a flower arranger – came in 2005, competing in the MR2 Championship. He won the drivers title, including four race wins. The following year he switched to the VW Cup. With four race wins, he finished the year fourth on points despite reliability issues with the car. In 2007 he won the championship. In 2008 he competed in the Porsche Carrera Cup GB, finishing as runner-up in the pro-am 1 class. Gilham spent two more years in the championship, finishing fourth in class during 2009 with Redline Racing, and third in class in 2010.

British Touring Car Championship
For 2011 he stepped up to the British Touring Car Championship. He competed in a Vauxhall Vectra for Triple 8 Race Engineering under the 888 Racing with Collins Contractors banner.
Gilham started the season well at Brands Hatch. He scored points in each of the first three meetings, before his form dropped off in the three after in which he scored no points.

It was announced in mid-August that due to funding issues he had lost his seat at Triple Eight. He missed the Knockhill round before returning at Rockingham for Geoff Steel Racing in a BMW 320si which ran a normally aspirated engine until the Silverstone round when a Next Generation Touring Car turbo engine was fitted.

For 2012 he driving for his own team, Tony Gilham Racing, which races under the RCIB Insurance & HARD banner. Gilham announced he would race the Super 2000-NGTC Honda Civic which Gordon Shedden had driven to second in the championship the previous season. He took pole position for the reversed grid race at Thruxton but having slipped down to third, damaged his car and retired from the race. Gilham drove a Vauxhall Insignia for Thorney Motorsport at the Snetterton meeting to allow Robb Holland to drive the Team HARD Honda Civic and to allow his team to familiarise itself with NGTC machinery. Gilham sat out the next two meetings as Holland and series newcomer Howard Fuller raced the Civic, but he made an unexpected return with Thorney Motorsport at Silverstone when Chris Stockton fell ill after qualifying. Gilham purchased Thorney Motorsport's Vauxhall Insignia prior to the final round of the season at the Brands Hatch GP circuit, along with a spare shell. Renault Clio Cup UK driver Aaron Williamson would race the S2000 Honda Civic at Brands Hatch alongside Gilham.

Racing Record

Complete British Touring Car Championship results
(key) (Races in bold indicate pole position – 1 point awarded just in first race) (Races in italics indicate fastest lap – 1 point awarded all races) (* signifies that driver lead race for at least one lap – 1 point given all races)

References

External links
Team HARD.  Official site
Tony Gilham's Team Hard Race Team Official Website
BTCC official site
Touring-Cars.Net Profile

Living people
English racing drivers
1979 births
British Touring Car Championship drivers
Porsche Carrera Cup GB drivers